Olivier de Funès (born 11 August 1949 in Paris), is a French former film actor and Air France pilot, son of actor Louis de Funès.

Partial filmography 
1965: Fantômas se déchaîne (of André Hunebelle) - Michou
1966: Le Grand Restaurant (of Jacques Besnard) - Marmiton Louis (uncredited)
1967: Les Grandes Vacances (of Jean Girault) - Gérard Bosquier
1969: Hibernatus (of Édouard Molinaro) - Didier de Tartas
1970: L'Homme orchestre (of Serge Korber) - Philippe Evans
1971: Perched on a Tree (of Serge Korber) - L'auto-stoppeur (final film role)

External links 
 

1949 births
Living people
French male film actors
French people of Spanish descent
Actors from Paris
Aviators from Paris